Botswana competed at the 2018 Commonwealth Games in the Gold Coast, Australia from April 4 to April 15, 2018. It was Botswana's 11th appearance at the Commonwealth Games.

The Botswana team consisted of 27 athletes (16 men and 11 women) that competed in five sports. However, Goitseone Seleka did not compete in any events. The goal for the team was to win eight medals.

Medalists

Competitors
The following is the list of number of competitors participating at the Games per sport/discipline.

Athletics

Men
Track & road events

Field events

Women
Track & road events

Boxing

Botswana participated with a team of 4 athletes (1 man and 3 women)

Lawn bowls

Botswana will compete in Lawn bowls.
 
Men

Women

Swimming

Botswana participated with 1 athlete (1 woman).

Women

Weightlifting

Botswana participated with one athlete (one man).

See also
Botswana at the 2018 Summer Youth Olympics

References

Nations at the 2018 Commonwealth Games
Botswana at the Commonwealth Games
2018 in Botswana sport